Oricopis insulana is a species of beetle in the family Cerambycidae. It was described by Arthur Sidney Olliff in 1890.

References

Desmiphorini
Beetles described in 1890